James Sharp (born 2 January 1976) is an English professional football player, who played as a defender.

Career
Sharp was a relative latecomer to the professional game, having signed his first contract at the age of 24, an event preceded by a spell at non-league Andover. He started his professional football career with Hartlepool United in 2000. After 60 appearances in three years with Hartlepool & a player of the year award, Sharp fell out of favour at Hartlepool and moved to Scottish club Falkirk on a free transfer in 2003.

After a year-and-a-half with the Bairns, Sharp was loaned out to Brechin City in February 2005 until the end of the season. In which time, Sharp helped Brechin to the Division 2 title along with picking up a winners medal for Falkirk in same season as Falkirk claimed the Division 1 title. Sharp made his return to England with a free transfer to Torquay United in August 2005. Playing in 32 league matches in the 2005-06 season, Sharp was named captain of the club, but was released at the season's end.

After spending pre-season training with the club, Sharp was signed by Shrewsbury Town on a one-month contract on 8 August 2006. However, on 24 August 2006, Sharp chose to terminate the contract to pursue other options. He had played just 10 minutes for Shrewsbury — the final ten minutes of the League Cup first round match at Birmingham City, where Birmingham won via a late goal.

Sharp was subsequently signed by Rochdale, debuting for them on 2 September 2006 in the 1–1 draw at home to Hereford United. His first goal for the club came against Shrewsbury, on 30 September, just a month after leaving them.

He was released by Rochdale at the end of the 2006-07 season and was signed by Scottish Second Division club Airdrie United. After a spell of 6 months with Airdrie, Sharp was forced to retire from the professional game through an achilles injury.

References

External links
Post War English & Scottish Football League A - Z Player's Transfer Database profile

1976 births
Living people
Sportspeople from Reading, Berkshire
English footballers
Association football central defenders
Andover F.C. players
Hartlepool United F.C. players
Falkirk F.C. players
Brechin City F.C. players
Torquay United F.C. players
Shrewsbury Town F.C. players
Rochdale A.F.C. players
Airdrieonians F.C. players
Scottish Football League players
English Football League players
Footballers from Berkshire